Flowerdale is a town in Victoria, Australia. It is in the Shire of Murrindindi  local government area,  from the state capital, Melbourne and in the foothills of the Great Dividing Range, in the upper catchment of the Goulburn River system. At the 2021 Census, Flowerdale had a population of 790.

Flowerdale Post Office opened on 4 February 1881 and closed in 1974.

The area was devastated by a  bushfire in February 2009 with the loss of many houses, however the school, hotel and community hall were spared.

Video commentary on reconstruction effort at Deloitte TV Australia.

Hazeldene

Flowerdale absorbed the entire adjacent town of Hazeldene on 9 April 2014, when the state government formally merged the two towns. The council, which had supported the move, cited a community desire for a "unified sense of community identity" following the Black Saturday bushfires, which had caused significant damage in both towns.

Hazeldene had a population of 535 at the 2006 census. Over 200 houses had been destroyed and over 10 deaths had been recorded as occurring in Hazeldene during the bushfires. The General Store and Post Office were spared, but the Jarara Community Centre was destroyed in the bushfires. In the 2009–2010 Budget, Murrindindi Shire Council indicated that the Jarara Community Centre would be rebuilt, but due to the high fire danger associated with its previous site, in Silver Creek Road, Council would be rebuilding it elsewhere within Hazeldene.

Sport
Golf was played at the course of the Valley View Golf Coaching Centre on Spring Valley Road, Flowerdale, closed since ~2012.
Tennis and Cricket at the Spring Valley Recreation Reserve

References

Towns in Victoria (Australia)
Shire of Murrindindi
Shire of Mitchell